Cristina Bucșa and Marta Kostyuk were the defending champions but chose not to participate.

Anastasia Dețiuc and Miriam Kolodziejová won the title, defeating Aliona Bolsova and Oksana Selekhmeteva in the final, 6–3, 1–6, [10–8].

Seeds

Draw

Draw

References
Main Draw

Axion Open - Doubles